Gatundu South is an electoral constituency in Kiambu County, Kenya and the seat of the District Officer in Gatundu Town. It is one of twelve constituencies in Kiambu County. The constituency has four wards, Kiamwangi, Kiganjo, Ndarugo and Ng'enda all of them are within Kiambu County council. The constituency was established before the 1997 General Elections. Previously it was part of the larger Gatundu Constituency which was split into Gatundu South Constituency and Gatundu North Constituency it is ranked 182 out of 210 Constituencies in Kenya in size and 165 out of 210 in population size.

Two of Kenya's Presidents are from Gatundu South Constituency: Mzee Jomo Kenyatta (Kenya's founding father and first President of The Republic of Kenya 1964-1978) and his son President Uhuru Kenyatta, 2013–Present.

The current Gatundu South MP is Gabriel (GG) Kagombe who succeeded Moses Kuria in the 2022 Kenya general elections.

Theta Dam
Theta Dam is in Gatundu South it's located inside Kinale Forest, its being constructed across Theta River in Gatundu South constituency. The project includes construction of a 17 meter high compacted earth fill dam, Construction of a reinforced concrete spillway and Laying of a 3.5 km long 500mm diameter steel pipeline up to the Mundoro forest edge.

On completion, Theta dam reservoir will have a storage capacity of 2 million cubic meters (2 Billion liters). This will enable production of 15,000 m3/day of water that will augment both the Ndarugu and Thiririka water projects reliability. This will improve water supply to the upper parts of Gatundu such as Gachika, Kiamuoria, Kiganjo, Gatitu of greater Kiganjo location and upper parts of greater Ndarugu locations.

Members of Parliament

Population Data  

Area
  (Ranked 182 of 210 Constituencies) 
Population
 107,049 (Ranked 165 of 210 Constituencies) 
Population Density
  (Ranked 40 of 210 Constituencies) 
Male
 51,656
Female
 55,393
Gender Index (women to men)
 1.08 (Ranked 53 of 210 Constituencies) 
Households
 28,037
Average Household size
 3.82 (Ranked 167 of 210 Constituencies) 
Registered Voters
 54,740
Proportion of Population Registered to Vote
 0.48 (Ranked 19 of 210 Constituencies) 
Proportion of Youth Voters
 0.42 (Ranked 162 of 210 Constituencies)

Locations and wards

References

External links 
Map of the constituency

Constituencies in Kiambu County